Arcte taprobana is a moth of the family Noctuidae. It is found in Sri Lanka.

References

Moths of Asia
Moths described in 1885
Catocalinae